Novaya Kosa (Yañı-Atav) is a rural locality (a selo) and the administrative centre of Novokosinsky Selsoviet, Babayurtovsky District, Republic of Dagestan, Russia. The population was 664 as of 2010. There are 6 streets.

Geography
Novaya Kosa is located 53 km east of Babayurt (the district's administrative centre) by road. Babayurt is the nearest rural locality.

References 

Rural localities in Babayurtovsky District